Louis Sleigher (born October 23, 1958) is a Canadian former professional ice hockey player who played 62 games in one season with the Birmingham Bulls in the World Hockey Association and 194 games over seven seasons in the National Hockey League with the Quebec Nordiques and the Boston Bruins between 1978 and 1986.

In the 1984 NHL Playoffs, Sleigher was a major part of the Good Friday Massacre, in which he knocked Montreal Canadiens player Jean Hamel unconscious with a sucker-punch during a bench-clearing brawl. The blow eventually contributed to the end of Hamel's playing career. After playing six games for Quebec the following season, Sleigher was dealt to the Boston Bruins where he played two more seasons before retiring.

Career statistics

Regular season and playoffs

External links
 

1958 births
Living people
Birmingham Bulls players
Boston Bruins players
Canadian ice hockey right wingers
Chicoutimi Saguenéens (QMJHL) players
Fredericton Express players
Ice hockey people from Quebec
Montreal Canadiens draft picks
People from Gaspésie–Îles-de-la-Madeleine
Quebec Nordiques players